Tamatsu Maru was a World War II Japanese landing craft depot ship completed in January 1944 and remembered for the heavy loss of life when sunk by  on 19 August 1944. Between 4,406 and 4,755 Japanese soldiers and seamen drowned.

Early history
Tamatsu Maru was laid down at Mitsui Shipbuilding on 4 November 1942, launched on 18 August 1943, and completed on 20 January 1944. Its first military loading was from Moji to Manila with convoy Hi-45 in February 1944. It returned to Japan in March to transport elements of the 30th Infantry Division of the Imperial Japanese Army (IJA) from Pusan to the Philippines with convoy Hi-63 in May. It returned to Japan with convoy Hi-62 in early June to transport the IJA 5th Field Heavy Artillery and 58th Independent Mixed Brigade to the Philippines with convoy MOMA-01 in July. It returned to Japan in early August with convoy Hi-68.

Loss 
Tamatsu Maru departed Pusan on 8 August 1944 carrying the Japanese 2nd Battalion and regimental headquarters of the 13th Independent Infantry Regiment from Korea for defense of the Philippines. It joined convoy Hi-71 departing Moji on 10 August, and stopping at the Mako naval base in the Pescadores on 15 August. Convoy Hi-71 departed Mako on 17 August and was discovered by  that evening. Redfish assembled other submarines for a radar-guided wolfpack attack on the evening of 18 August in heavy rain.

As the convoy was scattered by heavy seas and evasive maneuvers, Tamatsu Maru apparently became separated from convoy escorts. Spadefish found Tamatsu Maru on a northerly course about 0330 19 August and fired a salvo of six torpedoes. Spadefish heard two torpedoes hit. Convoy escorts were unaware of the ship's location until one of them discovered thousands of floating bodies that afternoon. The sinking of Tamatsu Maru was the fourth worst loss of life on any Japanese vessel during the war taking down 4,755 troops and 135 merchant seamen.

See also 
List by death toll of ships sunk by submarines

Sources

Notes

Ships built by Mitsui Engineering and Shipbuilding
1943 ships
Maritime incidents in August 1944
Ships sunk by American submarines